Claude Roger-Marx (12 November 1888, Paris – 17 May 1977, Paris), was a French writer, and playwright, as well as an art critic and art historian like his father Roger Marx (1859–1913). He also used the pen name "Claudinet".

Biography 
Roger-Marx, son of Roger Marx and Elisa Nathan (1859–1933), achieved his baccalauréat in 1906, studied at the faculties of law and humanities of the University of Paris, and began to write poems and plays. In 1912 he married Florestine Caroline Nathan, who gave birth to their two children. He published two novels, before he wrote plays. In 1927 he became a chevalier  of the Légion d'honneur. Roger Marx's art collection included Edouard Manet's La Sultan and Paul Signac's Voiles dans la brume. Canal de la Giudecca.

Nazi persecution in France 
When Nazi Germany invaded France in 1940 in World War II, Jews were persecuted. Roger-Marx, who was Jewish, was suspended from his duties in December 1940. He fled to Marseille in 1941, and in 1943 to Isère. His art collection was seized by the E.R.R., the Nazi looting organization operating in France. His son, Denis, was imprisoned by the Gestapo and executed on February 25 1944.

Postwar 
His real career as critic and art historian started after the war. He was a great admirer of art, and became inspector of the Écoles des Beaux-Arts (schools of fine arts). He also was chroniqueur attitré of the Figaro, especially the Figaro Littéraire, its literary supplement, as well as of the  Revue de Paris. In 1956 he was made commander of the Légion d'honneur.

Works 
 Novels
 Les Deux Amis, novel, Albin Michel, 1921
 La Tragédie légère, novel, Albin Michel, 1922
Comedies
 Simili, comedy in three acts, Stock, 1930
 Dimanche, comedy in one act, Andrieu frères, 1934
 Biens oisifs, comedy in one act, Stock, 1936
 Lecture, comedy in one act, Stock, 1936
 La Pensionnaire, comedy in three acts, Lejeune, 1936
 Réussite, comedy in one act, Librairie théâtrale, 1936
 80 printemps, ou les Ardeurs de l'hiver, comedy in one act, Lejeune, 1936
 Nino, comedy in one act, Les Annales, 1937
 Marie ou la Manière douce, comedy in three acts, Denoël, 1938
 Art historical works
 Graphic art [of] the 19th century
 Vuillard: His Life & Work, Paul Elek 1946
 Les Lithographies de Renoir, André Sauret, Monte-Carlo, 1952
 Degas: Dancers
 Delacroix (The Great Draughtsmen)
 Dufy: At the races (The petite library of art)
Dunoyer De Segonzac, 1951
 Daumier: Paintings
 Les Lithographies de Toulouse-Lautrec
 La Gravure originale en France de Manet à nos jours (French Original Prints from Manet to the Present Time)
 Bonnard
 Vertès: Un et divers

References

External links 
 
 

French art critics
French art historians
Jewish writers
Jewish dramatists and playwrights
20th-century French dramatists and playwrights
University of Paris alumni
Chevaliers of the Légion d'honneur
Commandeurs of the Légion d'honneur
Writers from Paris
1888 births
1977 deaths